Sound of Impact is a live album by the post-hardcore band Big Black.  It was released in limited edition in 1987. The band did not include its name anywhere on the album.

Critical reception
Alternative Rock wrote that the album captured a "typically brutal" live performance.

Track listing
"Ready Men"  
"Big Money"  
"Pigeon Kill"  
"Passing Complexion"  
"Crack Up"  
"RIP" 
"Jordan, Minnesota"  
"Steelworker (Short Fragment)"  
"Cables" 
"Pigeon Kill"  
"Kerosene" 
"Bad Penny" 
"Deep Six"  
"RIP"  
"Rema Rema"

Personnel

Dave Riley: Bass Guitar 
Santiago Durango: Guitar, Backing Vocals
Steve Albini: Guitar, Vocals
Roland: Drums

References

Big Black albums
1987 live albums
Blast First albums